Trichomanes elegans is a fern species in the family Hymenophyllaceae. The name has also been used incorrectly for two different species.

Taxonomy
Trichomanes elegans was first described by Louis Claude Richard in 1792. Two other species were later called Trichomanes elegans:
 Trichomanes elegans Poir. is an illegitimate synonym of Davallia denticulata (Burm.) Mett.
 Trichomanes elegans Rudge is an illegitimate synonym of Trichomanes diversifrons (Bory) Mett.

References 

Hymenophyllales
Plants described in 1984